Xanthorhoe lophogramma is a species of moth in the family Geometridae. It is endemic to New Zealand and if found in the South Island. This species inhabits dry beech scrub but its larval host is unknown. Adult moths are on the wing in January. This species is classified as "At Risk, Nationally Uncommon" by the Department of Conservation.

Taxonomy 

This species was first described by Edward Meyrick in 1897 using a specimen collected by George Hudson at Castle Hill. Hudson discovered this species in January 1893 and discussed and illustrated it in both his 1898 and 1928 books. In 1939 L. B. Prout proposed that the species be moved to the genus Larentia, however this proposal did not gain acceptance. The holotype species is held at the Natural History Museum, London. This species is regarded as having a dubious taxonomic status. At present this species is in an unrevised group and is regarded by some experts as lacking clear diagnostic features and not being distinguishable from X. semifissata. Despite this, it was classified as having a New Zealand Threat Classification status in 2017.

Description 
Meyrick described the species as follows:

Although very similar in appearance to its close relative X. semifissata, Meyrick states it can be distinguished from that species by the distinctive form of the posterior edge of the median band and the less distinct pale striae beyond it. Hudson also points out that the hindwings are dark ochreous in colour and lack the transverse markings of X. semifissata.

Distribution 
X. lophogramma is endemic to New Zealand. It can be found in Marlborough, North Canterbury, Mid Canterbury, Mackenzie and Central Otago areas.

Biology and behaviour 
This species prefers lowland habitat of dry beech scrub. It is on the wing in January.

Host species and habitat 
The host plants for the larvae of this species are unknown but are likely to be low growing herbs in the family Brassicaceae.

Conservation status 
This species has been classified as having the "At Risk, Naturally Uncommon" conservation status under the New Zealand Threat Classification System. This species is regarded as being under threat as most of its lowland habitat is now highly modified by introduced plants.

References 

Xanthorhoe
Moths of New Zealand
Endemic fauna of New Zealand
Moths described in 1897
Endangered biota of New Zealand
Taxa named by Edward Meyrick
Endemic moths of New Zealand